Transaction Tax may refer to:
Financial transaction tax
Automated Payment Transaction tax